Martin Lo (born 3 September 1997) is a Vietnamese-Australian professional soccer player who plays as a midfielder for V.League 1 club Haiphong.

Personal life
Born in Sydney, Australia, Lo's parents are Vietnamese immigrants.

Honours
Pho Hien FC
V.League 2 runner-up: 2019

Haiphong FC
V.League 1 runner-up: 2022

References

External links

1999 births
Living people
Australian soccer players
Australian people of Vietnamese descent
Sportspeople of Vietnamese descent
Association football forwards
Western Sydney Wanderers FC players
Marconi Stallions FC players
Soccer players from Sydney
Bonnyrigg White Eagles FC players
Haiphong FC players
National Premier Leagues players
V.League 2 players
V.League 1 players